Matichya Chuli is a Marathi movie, released on 10 April 2006. The film was produced by Ashwami Manjrekar and directed by Atul Kale and Sudesh V. Manjerekar. Actor Sudhir Joshi died midway through shooting of this film, so he was replaced by Anand Abhyankar. Half of the scenes are played by Joshi and other half by Abhyankar. Sanjay Mone plays the role of narrator.

Cast 
 Sudhir Joshi
 Vandana Gupte
 Ankush Choudhary
 Madhura Velankar
 Sanjay Mone

Soundtrack
The music is provided by Ajit Parab, Atul Kale and Hrushikesh Kamerkar.

External links

References 

2006 films
2000s Marathi-language films
Films directed by Sudesh Manjrekar
Films directed by Atul Kale